Michael Luce (born September 5, 1941) is an American bobsledder. He competed in the two-man and the four-man events at the 1968 Winter Olympics.

References

1941 births
Living people
American male bobsledders
Olympic bobsledders of the United States
Bobsledders at the 1968 Winter Olympics
People from Port Henry, New York